The discography of American rapper Joey Badass consists of three studio albums, 2 extended play (EP), three mixtapes, and 24 singles (including three as a featured artist).

Joey Badass released his debut mixtape, 1999, on June 12, 2012. The mixtape was followed up by Summer Knights, which was released in July 2013. Joey Badass went on to release his debut studio album B4.Da.$$ on January 20, 2015. He released his second studio album All-Amerikkkan Badass in April 2017. He released his third studio album 2000 on July 22, 2022.

Studio albums

EPs

Mixtapes

Singles

As lead artist

As featured artist

Other charted songs

Guest appearances

References

Discographies of American artists
Hip hop discographies